Chambliss is a surname. Notable people with the surname include:

Chris Chambliss (born 1948), American baseball player
Clyde Chambliss, Alabama politician
John R. Chambliss (1833–1864), American soldier
John R. Chambliss Sr. (1809–1875), American politician  
Kirby Chambliss (born 1959), American flier 
Robert Edward Chambliss (1904–1985), American domestic terrorist
Saxby Chambliss (born 1948), American politician, Senior Senator from Georgia
William Chambliss (1933–2014), American criminologist and sociologist

Other uses

Chambliss, Texas, an unincorporated community